Stigmella macrolepidella is a moth of the family Nepticulidae. It is found in mainland Greece (the north and Peloponnesos), Rhodes, Turkey and possibly Haifa in Israel.

The wingspan is 3.8-4.7 mm. Adults are on wing in May, June, August and reared from September to October.

The larvae feed on Quercus macrolepis. They mine the leaves of their host plant. The mine consists of a full depth corridor. The first section of this corridor is filled with frass. Later sections are mostly free of frass.

External links
Fauna Europaea
bladmineerders.nl
The Quercus Feeding Stigmella Species Of The West Palaearctic: New Species, Key And Distribution (Lepidoptera: Nepticulidae)

Nepticulidae
Moths of Europe
Moths of Asia
Moths described in 1978